Şehzade is the Ottoman form of the Persian title Shahzadeh, and refers to the male descendants of an Ottoman sovereign in the male line. This title is equivalent to "prince of the blood imperial" in English.

Origin 
Şehzade derives from the Persian word shahzadeh or shahzada. In the realm of a shah (or shahanshah), a prince or princess of the blood was logically called shahzada, the term being derived from "shah" using the Persian patronymic suffix -zādeh or -zada, meaning "son of", "daughter of", "descendant of", or "born of". However, the precise full styles can differ in the court traditions of each monarchy.

Usage in Ottoman royalty 
In Ottoman royalty, the title şehzade designates male descendants of sovereigns in the male line. In formal address, this title is used with title sultan before a given name, reflecting the Ottoman conception of sovereign power as a family prerogative. Only a şehzade had the right to succeed to the throne. Before the reign of Mehmed II (1444-1446 and 1451-1481), sons of sultans used the title Çelebi after their name.

The formal way of addressing a şehzade is Devletlû Najabatlu Şehzade Sultan (given name) Hazretleri Efendi, i.e., Sultan Imperial Prince (given name) or simply Imperial Prince (given name). The style of consorts of şehzades is hanımefendi. Sons of şehzades also carried the same title as their fathers, and daughters of şehzades hold the title sultan after their name. The Osmanoğlu family continues to use these titles.

Ottoman Crown Prince 
A designated crown prince used the title of Vali Ahad or Veli Ahd, meaning "the successor by virtue of a covenant", and the full style of Devletlû Najabatlu Valiahd-i Saltanat Şehzade-i Javanbahd (given name) Efendi Hazretleri. The title for consorts of crown princes was "Vali Ahad Zevcesi", with the full style of Veliahd Zevcesi (given name) (rank) Hanımefendi Hazretleri.

Feminine equivalent 
There is no feminine equivalent of şehzade or special title for princesses in Ottoman royalty. In Persian, shahzade is used for both male and female descendants of a monarch. The royalty of the Indian Mughal Empire used the title shahzada for princes and the feminine equivalent of this title, shahzadi, for princesses.

Before the 16th century, Ottoman imperial princesses and consorts of the Sultan held the same title after their given name, hatun, the Turkish form of the Mongolian title khatun (the feminine equivalent of khan). By the beginning of the 16th century, Ottoman princesses held the title of sultan after their given name, titles that were also held by other prominent members of the Ottoman imperial family: the emperor (together with khan), princes (together with title şehzade), the emperor's legal mother (together with title valide), the chief consort of the emperor (together with title haseki), the daughters of princesses (together with title hanım), and the sons of princesses (together with Persian patronymic suffix -zāde). This usage underlines the Ottoman conception of sovereign power as family prerogative.

The formal way of addressing an Ottoman princess is Devletlû İsmetlu (given name) Sultân Aliyyetü'ş-Şân Hazretleri, i.e., Sultana (given name). The title of sons of princesses are sultanzade and daughters of princesses are hanimsultan. The title of the consorts of princesses are called damat. Sultana, a title which usually referred to female sultans relative to Westerners, does not exist in the Ottoman language. Nevertheless, westerners often translated their official title, sultan, to sultana, possibly to distinguish them from the Ottoman sovereign.

Example of imperial princes (şehzade) 
 Şehzade Mustafa (1515–1553), son of Suleiman the Magnificent. His story was very popular, especially rumors of his execution in 1553. In 1561, eight years after Mustafa's death, the French author Gabriel Bounin wrote a tragedy titled La Soltane about the role of Hürrem Sultan in Mustafa's death. This tragedy marks the first time the Ottomans were introduced on stage in France.
 Şehzade Yahya (1585–1649), son of Murad III. He was baptized at an Orthodox Christian monastery and gained support for his claim to the throne from his nephew, Ahmed I.
 Abdülmecid II (29 May 1868 – 23 August 1944), son of Abdülaziz. He was the only şehzade to hold the title of caliph; Ottoman caliphs before Abdülmecid only obtained the title of caliph when they became emperor.
 Bayezid Osman (23 June 1924 - 6 January 2017), second son of Sultan Abdülmecid I's grandson Ibrahim Tevfik. He was the 44th Head of the Imperial House of Osman from 23 September 2009 to 6 January 2017.

Example of imperial princesses (sultans) 
 Mihrimah Sultan (21 March 1522 – 25 January 1578), daughter of Suleiman the Magnificent. She was the most powerful imperial princess in Ottoman history and one of the prominent figures during the Sultanate of Women. Her ability and power, and her running of the affairs of the harem in the same manner as the sultan's mother, resulted in Mihrimah being referred to as Valide sultan for Selim II, although she was not called by this title on any historical record.
Fatma Sultan (1605/1606 – after 1667), daughter of Ahmed I. She was known for her many political marriages.
Ayşe Sultan  (2 November 1887 - 10 August 1960), daughter of Abdülhamid II. She was known for publishing her memoirs by the name of Babam Sultan Abdülhamid in 1960.
Ayşe Gülnev Sultan (born 17 January 1971), great-great-great-granddaughter of Murad V. She is a director of property investment and development companies, and writes and researches historical pieces on Ottoman history.

See also
List of Ottoman titles and appellations
 List of sultans of the Ottoman Empire
 List of Ottoman princesses
 Şehzade Mosque

References

Ottoman titles
Turkish words and phrases
Ottoman dynasty